Leopold Suhodolčan (10 August 1928 – 8 February 1980) was a Slovene writer, best known for his juvenile fiction. Together with Stanko Kotnik he was one of the conceptors of the Reading Badge of Slovenia competition that still runs today as a motivation for primary school children in reading and literacy.

Suhodolčan was born in Žiri in 1928. He worked as a teacher and headmaster in Prevalje in Slovenian Carinthia. Though he wrote adult fiction, he is better known for his writing for young readers. His children's books have also been translated and published outside Slovenia. He died in Golnik in 1980. The Central Carinthian Library in Ravne na Koroškem has a memorial room dedicated to Suhodolčan.

He won the Levstik Award twice, in 1965 for his book Velikan in Pajac (The Giant and the Clown) and in 1979 for his book Piko Dinozaver (Piko the Dinosaur) and other books.

Published works

Adult fiction  
 Človek na zidu (Man on the Wall), short stories, 1960
 Svetlice (Lights), novel, 1965
 Dobrijska balada (The Balad of Dobrije), short stories, 1967
 Bog ljubezni (The God of Love), novel, 1968
 Sledovi molčečih (Traces of the Silent), novel, 1970
 Noro življenje (Mad Life), novel, 1972
 Najdaljša noč (The Longest Night), novel, 1975
 Med reko in zemljo (Between the River and Land), short stories, 1977
 Trenutki in leta (Moments and Years), novel, 1979
 Snežno znamenje (The Snow Sign), novel, 1981

Juvenile fiction 
 Ognjeni možje (Men of Fire), 1955
 Sejem na zelenem oblaku (The Fair on the Green Cloud), 1958
 Deček na črnem konju (The Boy on the Black Horse), 1961
 Skriti dnevnik (The Hidden Diary), 1961
 Hi, konjiček (Go, Horsie), 1964
 Potovanje slona Jumba (Jumbo the Elephant's Journey), 1965
 Velikan in pajac (The Giant and the Clown), 1965
 Pikapolonček (The He-Ladybird), 1968
 Rdeči lev (The Red Lion), 1968
 Veliki in mali kapitan (Captain Big and Captain Little), 1968
 Rumena podmornica (The Yellow Submarine), 1969
 Krojaček Hlaček (Trooser the Tailor), 1970
 Punčka (The Little Girl), 1970
 Mornar na kolesu (The Sailor on the Bike), 1973
 Naočnik in očalnik, mojstra med detektivi (Specs and Goggles, Master Detectives), 1973
 Kam se je skril krojaček Hlaček? (Where Had Trooser the Tailor Hidden?), 1974
 Dvanajst slonov (twelve Elephants), 1976
 Na kmetiji (On the Farm), 1976
 Na večerji s krokodilom: nove detektivske mojstrovine Naočnika in Očalnika (Dinner With the Crocodile, the New Detective Adventures of Specs and Goggles), 1976
 Pipa, klobuk in dober nos (The Pipe, the Hat and a Good Nose), 1976
 7 nagajivih (7 Naughty Ones), 1976
 Kurirčkov dnevnik: kurirček Andrej si je zapisal in narisal v dnevnik, kar je doživel Kurirčkov dnevnik (The Young Courier's Diary), 1977
 Stopinje po zraku in kako sta jih odkrila Naočnik in Očalnik, mojstra med detektivi (Footprints in the Air and How They Were Discovered by Specs and Goggles, Master Detectives), 1977
 Piko Dinozaver (Piko the Dinosaur), 1978
 Zgodilo se je 6. aprila (It Happened on 6 April), 1978
 Cepecepetavček (Stompaboutling), 1979
 Levi in desni klovn (The Left and Right Clown), 1979
 Markov maj (Mark's May), 1979
 O medvedku in dečku (About A Bear and A Boy), 1979
 Peter Nos je vsemu kos (Peter Nose Can Do It All), 1979
 PraMatija ali Bučman (Ol'Matija or Thickhead), 1980
 Pri nas in okoli nas (At Our Place and Hereabouts), 1981
 Pisatelj, povej mi (Tell Me, Mr Writer), 1982
 Kuža Luža (Puddles the Dog), 1984
 O dedku in medvedku (About A Grandad and A Bear), 1987
 Koroške pripovedke (Carinthian Tales), 1998

References

Slovenian writers
Slovenian children's writers
Yugoslav science fiction writers
1928 births
1980 deaths
Levstik Award laureates
People from Žiri
People from Prevalje